Maria Island or 'wukaluwikiwayna' in [palawa kani) is a mountainous island located in the Tasman Sea, off the east coast of Tasmania, Australia.

The island was named in 1642 by Dutch explorer Abel Tasman after Maria van Diemen (née van Aelst), wife of Anthony van Diemen, the Governor-General of the Dutch East Indies in Batavia. The island was known as Maria's Isle in the early 19th century.

The locality of Maria Island is in the local government area of Glamorgan–Spring Bay in the South-east region of Tasmania.

Local community and economy
The strait between Maria Island and the east coast of mainland Tasmania is called Mercury Passage and was named after HMS Mercury, commanded by John Henry Cox, who charted the area in 1789. There are two towns of size in this part of the east coast: Orford at the mouth of the Prosser River and Triabunna, some  further north at the head of Spring Bay.

The island's sole settlement is Darlington, near the northern tip of the island. Darlington has many old buildings and it has no permanent inhabitants other than a few park rangers. During the summer holiday period, up to several hundred tourists visit the island. Tourism is important to the local economy. In nearby Triabunna other major industries are fishing, forestry and agriculture.  Rock lobster, scalefish, scallops and abalone are taken near the island by both commercial and recreational fishermen, and mussels are farmed in Mercury Passage.

History

Aboriginal people
Maria Island has a rich history. Before the colonial era, Aboriginal people of the Tyreddeme band of the Oyster Bay tribe journeyed regularly to the island and much evidence of their presence remains, particularly around the bays on either side of the island's isthmus.  In 1802 the French expedition led by Nicolas Baudin encountered the Aboriginal people of Maria Island, as did the whalers of the early 19th century. René Maugé, the zoologist on Baudin's expedition, was buried on Point Maugé on south Maria Island.

Convicts

For two periods during the first half of the 19th century, Maria Island hosted convict settlements.  The island's first convict era was between 1825 and 1832 and its second - the probation station era - between 1842 and 1851. Among those held during the second era was the Irish nationalist leader William Smith O'Brien, exiled for his part in the Young Irelander Rebellion of 1848. His cottage still exists in the nearby former penal colony Port Arthur to where he was deported after his time on Maria Island. He was later transferred to New Norfolk on the Derwent River upstream of Hobart.

Three structures from the first convict era remain in the Darlington area: the Commissariat Store built in 1825 and presently used as the park's reception and visitor centre; the convict penitentiary, completed in 1828 and now used to accommodate visitors rather than detain them; and the convict-built dam on Bernacchis Creek, which still provides Darlington's water.

Industry and farming
Sealing was conducted on the island from at least 1805. Shore-based bay whaling was conducted in the 1830s and 1840s at four locations on the island: Darlington, Isle du Nord, Whalers Cove and Haunted Bay. In the 19th century, whaling ships sometimes anchored off shore and hunted for whales.

From the 1880s, the Italian entrepreneur Diego Bernacchi set up island enterprises, including silk and wine production and a cement factory, quarrying limestone deposits at the Fossil Cliffs for the raw material. A substantial cement works was built at Darlington in the early 1920s, with a 2 ft gauge tramway linking the quarries to the cement works and a new jetty. At the height of its fortunes in the early 20th century, Darlington had hundreds of residents and several hotels. The design and layout of the company town established by Bernacchi reflected prevailing ideas of paternalism, though archaeological survey found that the workers cottages had been individualised by their inhabitants. By July 1930, all of those ventures had failed for a number of reasons, including the Great Depression, poor quality limestone, and competition from mainland producers who were not burdened with high costs of transport.

For a period of 40 years until the late 1960s, the island was dominated by farming. The South Island was farmed by John Robey, a South African, with his wife Hilda. Robey's Farm is located on the west side of the south island, and although essentially complete in a "just walked away" fashion as late as the early 1980s, the location has since been extensively vandalised, and the farmhouse further damaged by weather and neglect by the Parks and Wildlife Service.

National Park

The Tasmanian Government resumed all of the island's freehold land and established the national park, proclaimed in 1972 and extended in 1991, to include part of the surrounding sea.

Environment

Geography
Maria Island takes the form of a figure-eight, with the northern section of the island significantly larger than the southern. Maria Island has been separated from nearby mainland Tasmania for some 3-4 thousand years.

Flora and fauna
Fourteen distinct terrestrial plant communities occur on the island, which is mostly clothed in various forms of eucalypt forest.  Natural and historical clearings provide grazing for many animals, such as bare-nosed wombats (Vombatus ursinus) which occur in high quantities on the island and Tasmanian pademelons.  Nearly all the island's animals are native to Tasmania although some, including eastern grey kangaroos, red-necked wallabies, and Cape Barren geese, were introduced during the late 1960s and early 1970s.  Fallow deer were also introduced to the island and were present primarily in the French's Farm area, but sometimes wandered as far north as the small marsh behind Hopground Beach, just north of Rutherford Beach. Sheep were present until around 1981, escapes from prior sheep farming operations.  Other animals include common brushtail, ringtail possums, short-beaked echidnas and three species of snake.

Birds
Maria Island has been identified by BirdLife International as an Important Bird Area (IBA) because it supports significant numbers of endangered swift parrots and forty-spotted pardalotes, over 1% of the world population of Pacific gulls, as well as populations of most of Tasmania's endemic bird species.

Tasmanian devils
In November 2012 captive Tasmanian devils were introduced to the island and are cared for by the Tasmania Parks and Wildlife Service staff who live on the island. These devils form part of the "insurance population" of devils unaffected by the devil facial tumour disease that is sweeping through mainland Tasmania's devil population. Tasmanian devils are sometimes seen by visitors. There is some evidence that the devils are impacting on the bird life of the island. A population of little penguins that numbered 3,000 breeding pairs before the introduction has since disappeared completely from the island.

Marine habitats
The marine section of the national park protects a representative area of Tasmanian East Coast marine habitat, and has significantly larger individuals and populations of key marine species than surrounding waters. This area is one of the most intensively studied marine protected areas in Australia and is popular with divers. The marine section of the park extends from an unnamed point north-east of Bishop and Clerk, westwards to Cape Boullanger and then southwards as far as Return Point.  The marine boundary's definition varies, but it is never more than 1 km from Maria Island's low water mark.

Climate

Access

Transport
A ferry sails multiple times a day from the town of Triabunna to the jetty in Darlington Bay at the northern end of Maria Island, a distance by sea of 16 km or nearly nine nautical miles. In winter, some sailings are subject to demand, while in summer extra sailings are provided. A previous ferry operation out of Louisville (near Orford) is now defunct. Common dolphins, Australian fur seals and seabirds such as Australasian gannets and shy albatrosses are often seen on the voyage.  Tourist flights to the island can be made from Cambridge Airport or Friendly Beaches.

Facilities
Very basic accommodation is available in Darlington in "the Penitentiary", a former place of internment, built during the first convict era.  Bookings can be made with the Parks and Wildlife Service. There are ten rooms that have bunk beds with vinyl mattresses, a table and chairs, and a wood heater.  Nine of the rooms sleep six people each, and the tenth sleeps fourteen people.  All cooking gear, lighting, bedding and food must be brought to the island.  There is no electricity or running water in the rooms, but toilets, hot showers, and barbecues are nearby. Many visitors also choose to camp in the camping area in Darlington - an advance booking is not necessary for this.

Activities and attractions

Walking, bicycling, swimming, snorkelling, diving, bird watching, wildlife observation and relaxation are the main activities undertaken by visitors. Many people take interest in Maria Island's history, and most of the island's walks include sites of historic interest.  The Painted Cliffs and the Fossil Cliffs are two popular walking destinations for day visitors, both on the island's coastline.  The Painted Cliffs are sandstone with beautiful patterns formed through staining by iron oxide.  The Fossil Cliffs are tall limestone cliffs containing prolific ancient fossils. Longer day walks include tracks that ascend Bishop and Clerk and Mount Maria. Mount Maria is a six- to seven-hour return walk from Darlington while Bishop and Clerk can be completed in about four hours return.

Nearly all roads and tracks on the island are suitable for bicycling. Bicycles and helmets can be rented in Triabunna and brought over on the ferry. A bicycle is a must for those who want to see as much of the island as possible on a day trip. Bicycle-riding is not permitted on beaches or on the two mountain tracks.

Haunted Bay is so named because of the constant calling in the evening of the many  fairy penguins that live there. The track south is the usual route for people doing bike rides or multi-day walks. This area is referred to by boaters as Chinamans Bay (Chinamans is the bay just north of Encampment Cove). Both Frenchs Farm and Encampment Cove have rainwater tanks. The Frenchs Farm tank is less likely to run out during summer. Water can be hard to find elsewhere.

From Encampment Cove it is only a little more than a  walk to the ruins of Maria Island's second (probation-era) convict station at Point Lesueur on the island's west coast (also known as Long Point).  Soldiers Beach and Bloodstone Beach on the western side of the island are also well worth the effort that it takes to reach them, as are Shoal Bay and Riedle Bay, the beaches either side of McRaes Isthmus.

See also

Darlington Probation Station
Protected areas of Tasmania
List of islands of Tasmania

References

Further reading

External links

Maria Island - Parks and Wildlife Service

Islands of Tasmania
Australian penal colonies
Defunct prisons in Tasmania
Important Bird Areas of Tasmania
Tombolos
Tasmanian Heritage Register
Seal hunting
Whaling stations in Australia
Maritime history of the Dutch East India Company
Convictism in Tasmania
Localities of Glamorgan–Spring Bay Council